Hypatius of Ephesus (fl. c. 530) was the metropolitan of Ephesus from 531 to about 538. He campaigned against Monophysitism and cooperated with Emperor Justinian I on various ecclesiastical issues. He was an early opponent of the authenticity of Pseudo-Dionysius the Areopagite.

References 

Ephesus
Justinian I